Chandla Assembly constituency is one of the 230 Vidhan Sabha (Legislative Assembly) constituencies of Madhya Pradesh state in central India. This constituency came into existence in 1951 as one of the 48 Vidhan Sabha constituencies of the erstwhile Vindhya Pradesh state, but it was abolished in 1956. It came into existence again in 1976. This constituency is reserved for the candidates belonging to the Scheduled castes since 2008, following delimitation of the legislative assembly constituencies.

Overview
Chandla (constituency number 49) is one of the 6 Vidhan Sabha constituencies located in Chhatarpur district. This constituency covers the entire Gaurihar tehsil, Chandla nagar panchayat and part of Laundi tehsil of the district.

Chandla is part of Khajuraho Lok Sabha constituency along with seven other Vidhan Sabha segments, namely, Rajnagar in this district, Pawai, Gunnaor and Panna in Panna district and Vijayraghavgarh, Murwara and Bahoriband in Katni district.

Members of Legislative Assembly
As from a constituency of Vindhya Pradesh:
 1951: Kamta Prasad, Indian National Congress 
As from a constituency of Madhya Pradesh:
 1977: Raghunath Singh Kalyan Singh, Janata Party
 1980: Satyavrat Chaturvedi, Indian National Congress (I)
 1985: Shyam Behari Pathak, Indian National Congress
 1990: Ansari Mohammed Gani, Bharatiya Janata Party
 1993: Satyavrat Chaturvedi, Indian National Congress
 1998: Vijay Bahadur Singh Bundela, Samajwadi Party 
 2003: Vijay Bahadur Singh Bundela, Samajwadi Party 
 2008: Ramdayal Ahirwar, Bharatiya Janata Party
 2013 : R.D. Prajapati, BJP

See also
 Chandla

References

Chhatarpur district
Assembly constituencies of Madhya Pradesh